The Treaty of Versailles of 1758, also called the Third Treaty of Versailles, confirmed the earlier treaties that had been signed at Versailles in 1756 and 1757 between Austria and France. However, it also revoked the 1757 treaty's agreement to create an independent state in the Southern Netherlands, ruled by Philip, Duke of Parma; it would remain under Austrian rule.

Aftermath
France, which was expecting a swift victory against Prussia because of a coalition with Austria, Russia, Sweden and Saxony, was caught up with the reality of the war. Although the decision to install a Bourbon monarch in the Austrian Netherlands was revoked, the treaty greatly hastened the ever-increasing desire of the coalition not only to defeat but also to destroy Prussia. The treaty seems to serve more as a moral guarantee to the coalition than an actual alliance, as the coalition suffered an undisputed string of defeats in the hand of the British and Prussia from 1759.

1758 treaties
Treaties of the Kingdom of France
Treaties of the Habsburg monarchy
Versailles
France–Habsburg monarchy relations
Treaties of the Seven Years' War
Treaties of the Silesian Wars